STRATEC SE is a company with worldwide operations that develops and produces analyzer systems and automation systems in the field of in-vitro-diagnostics. As a classic OEM (Original Equipment Manufacturer) supplier, STRATEC produces its systems almost exclusively on behalf of its customers. Alongside the systems themselves, the company also develops system software and software to connect the systems to laboratory software (Middleware). STRATEC is also responsible for development documentation, testing and delivering the systems, and supplying spare parts and consumables. STRATEC's customers are well known diagnostic companies like SIEMENS, Bio-Rad or Hologic.

Locations 
Since its foundation, the company's headquarters has been in Birkenfeld (Enz), Gräfenhausen neighborhood. The company also has several branches and development and production sites:

History 
The company was founded in Birkenfeld in 1979. Stratec Biomedical AG was publicly listed (IPO) in 1998. The wholly owned subsidiary Robion AG was founded in Switzerland in 2005 and later renamed as Stratec Biomedical Switzerland AG. Sanguin International, Ltd., UK, was acquired in 2006 and renamed as Stratec Biomedical UK, Ltd. This was followed in 2009 by the acquisition of Invitek Gesellschaft für Biotechnik & Biodesign mbH, Berlin, now Stratec Molecular GmbH, and of Ballista, Inc., USA, now Stratec Biomedical USA, Inc. in 2010. In November 2010, the company was admitted into the TecDAX stock market index. In March 2016 STRATEC acquired the Hungary-based company Diatron, a hematology system specialist. The company develops and manufactures  analyzer systems and complementary products for use in human and veterinary diagnostics. In June 2016 another acquisition was announced: Sony DADC Biosciences GmbH, headquartered in Anif, Austria. The Company has more than 1000 employees and is an OEM-supplier for smart consumable for diagnostics and life sciences applications.

In November 2018 the company completed its conversion into a European Company (Societas Europaea, SE), known as STRATEC SE.

References 

Medical technology companies of Germany
Companies based in Baden-Württemberg